The Gelidiaceae is a small family of red algae containing eight genera. Many species of this algae are used to make agar.

Uses
Agar can be derived from many types of red seaweeds, including those from families such as Gelidiaceaae, Gracilariaceae, Gelidiellaceae and Pterocladiaceae. It is a polysaccharide located in the inner part of the red algal cell wall. It is used in food material, medicines, cosmetics, therapeutic and biotechnology industries.

References 

 
Red algae families
Edible algae
Taxa named by Friedrich Traugott Kützing